The Scholar is a 1918 American silent comedy film featuring Oliver Hardy.

Cast
 Billy West as A Student
 Oliver Hardy (credited as Babe Hardy)
 ·Ethel Marie Burton as The Teacher (credited as Ethel Burton)
 Leatrice Joy
 Leo White
 Joe Bordeaux

Reception
Like many American films of the time, The Scholar was subject to cuts by city and state film censorship boards. For example, the Chicago Board of Censors required cuts, in Reel 1, of the man pulling pincushion from his posterior, silhouette of girl undressing, Reel 2, schoolroom scene were boy kicks girl, man pulling tack from posterior, West striking boy with slingshot in posterior as he bends over, the intertitle "Teacher, can I go out?" and West's vulgar actions of smelling after the intertitle "Teacher, please let him out", school superintendent thumbing nose, scene of man's underwear showing through his torn trousers, two scenes of jabbing man with pin cushion to include West pulling man's coat apart exposing trousers, fat man pointing after child speaks to him, and fat man falling exposing underwear.

See also
 List of American films of 1918
 Oliver Hardy filmography

References

External links
 

1918 films
1918 comedy films
1918 short films
American silent short films
Silent American comedy films
American black-and-white films
Films directed by Arvid E. Gillstrom
American comedy short films
1910s American films